Quinta da Regaleira  is a quinta located near the historic centre of Sintra, Portugal. It is classified as a World Heritage Site by UNESCO within the "Cultural Landscape of Sintra". Along with the other palaces in the area such as the Quinta do Relógio, Pena, Monserrate and Seteais palaces, it is considered one of the principal tourist attractions of Sintra. 

The property consists of a Romantic palace and chapel, and a luxurious park that features lakes, grottoes, wells, benches, fountains, and a vast array of exquisite constructions. The palace is also known as "The Palace of Monteiro the Millionaire", which is based on the nickname of its best known former owner, António Augusto Carvalho Monteiro. The palace was designed by the Italian architect Luigi Manini.

History

The land that is now Quinta da Regaleira had many owners over the years. It belonged to the Viscountess of Regaleira, a family of wealthy merchants from Porto, when it was sold in 1892 to Carvalho Monteiro for 25,000 réis. Monteiro was eager to build a bewildering place where he could collect symbols that reflected his interests and ideologies. With the assistance of the Italian architect Luigi Manini, he recreated the 4-hectare estate. 

In addition to other new features, he added enigmatic buildings that allegedly held symbols related to alchemy, Masonry, the Knights Templar, and the Rosicrucians. The architecture Manini designed evoked Roman, Gothic, Renaissance, and Manueline styles. The construction of the current estate commenced in 1904 and much of it was completed by 1910.

The estate was later sold in 1942 to Waldemar d'Orey, who used it as private residence for his extensive family. He ordered repairs and restoration work for the property. In 1987, the estate was sold, once again, to the Japanese Aoki Corporation and ceased to serve as a residence. The corporation kept the estate closed to the public for ten years, until it was acquired by the Sintra Town Council in 1997. Extensive restoration efforts were promptly initiated throughout the estate. It finally opened to the public in June 1998 and began hosting cultural events. In August of that same year, the Portuguese Ministry of Culture classified the estate as "public interest property".

Palace
The Regaleira Palace bears the same name as the entire estate. The structure's façade is characterised by exuberantly Gothic pinnacles, gargoyles, capitals, and an impressive octagonal tower.

The palace contains five floors (a ground floor, three upper floors, and a basement). The ground floor consists of a series of hallways that all connect the living room, dining room, billiards room, balcony, some smaller rooms, and several stairways. In turn, the first upper floor contains bedrooms and a dressing room. The second upper floor contains Carvalho Monteiro's office, and the bedrooms of female servants. The third upper floor contains the ironing room and a smaller room with access to a terrace. Finally, the basement contains the male servants' bedrooms, the kitchen (which featured an elevator for lifting food to the ground floor), and storage rooms.

Chapel

The Regaleira Chapel is a Roman Catholic Chapel, and stands in front of the palace's main façade. Its architecture is akin to the palace's. The interior of the chapel is richly decorated with frescoes, stained glass windows and lavish stuccoes. The frescoes contain representations of Teresa of Ávila and Saint Anthony, as well as other religious depictions. Meanwhile, the floor itself offers depictions of the armillary sphere of the Portuguese discoveries and the Order of Christ Cross, surrounded by pentagrams. Despite its relatively small size, the chapel has several floors.

Park

Much of the four hectares of land in the surrounding estate consists of a densely treed park lined with myriad roads and footpaths. The woods are neatly arranged in the lower parts of the estate, but are left wild and disorganised in the upper parts, reflecting Carvalho Monteiro's belief in primitivism. Decorative, symbolic, and lively structures can be found throughout the park.

Tunnels
The park also contains an extensive and enigmatic system of tunnels, which have multiple entry points that include: grottoes, the chapel, Waterfall Lake, and "Leda's Cave," which lies beneath the Regaleira Tower. The "Initiation Well" (see next section) connects to other tunnels via a series of underground walkways.

Initiation Wells
The Initiation Wells (also called initiatic wells or inverted towers) are two wells on the property that better resemble underground towers lined with stairs. These wells never served as water sources. Instead, they were used for ceremonial purposes that included Tarot initiation rites. The tunnels described above connect these wells to one another, in addition to various caves and other monuments located around the park. 

Of the two wells, the larger one contains a 27-metre spiral staircase with several small landings. The spacing of these landings, combined with the number of steps in the stairs, are linked to Tarot mysticism. Other references may be to Freemasonry, Rosicrucianism or Knights Templar rituals.  The smaller well contains straight stairs that connect a series of ring-shaped floors to one another. This well is also called the 'Unfinished Well'.

Lakes, fountains, and the aquarium
Bodies of water can be found in several places in the park. Two artificial lakes and several fountains were added by Monteiro. One of the most interesting and extravagant among them is the Aquarium, built as if it were naturally embedded in a large boulder. It was once considered the most important naturalist property in Regaleira. However, the Aquarium is no longer used and is poorly maintained.

See also
Sintra National Palace
Pena National Palace
Queluz National Palace
Monserrate Palace
Seteais Palace

References

Portuguese Association for Investigation
"Rotas & Destinos" magazine
 Quinta da Regaleira: Sintra Portugal. Fundação Cultursintra 
 Anes, José Manuel (1998, interviewed by Victor Mendanha). O Esoterismo da Quinta da Regaleira. Lisbon: Hugin
 Anes, José Manuel (2005). Os Jardins Iniciáticos da Quinta da Regaleira. Lisbon: Ed. Ésquilo
 Adrião, Vitor Manuel (2006). Quinta da Regaleira: A Mansão Filosofal de Sintra. Lisbon: Via Occidentalis Editora
 Veigas, Ana Sofia Fernandes (2007), Para uma Antropologia do Símbolo Estético: o paradigma da Quinta da Regaleira, Lisbon, Faculdade de Letras da Universidade de Lisboa

External links

Quinta da Regaleira homepage
Portuguese Institute for the Architectonic Heritage (Portuguese)
Antonio Augusto Carvalho Monteiro-Um Naturalista Pioneiro (Portuguese)

Palaces in Portugal
Buildings and structures in Sintra
Museums in Lisbon District
Historic house museums in Portugal
Gardens in Portugal